Uncinateridae is a family of glass sponges in the order Sceptrulophora.

References

External links

Hexactinellida
Sponge families